Critical Reviews in Biochemistry and Molecular Biology is a bimonthly scientific journal that publishes comprehensive review articles in the areas of biochemistry and molecular biology. It was established in 1972 under the name Critical Reviews in Biochemistry, obtaining its current name in 1989. It is published by Taylor and Francis Group and the editor-in-chief is Bridget Sheppard. According to the Journal Citation Reports, the journal has a 2014 impact factor of 7.714.

References

External links

English-language journals
Publications established in 1972
Biochemistry journals
Review journals
Taylor & Francis academic journals
Bimonthly journals